Year's Best SF 12 is a science fiction anthology edited by David G. Hartwell and Kathryn Cramer that was published in 2007.  It is the twelfth in the Year's Best SF series.

Contents

The book itself, as well as each of the stories, has a short
introduction by the editors.

Nancy Kress: "Nano Comes to Clifford Falls" (Originally in Asimov's, 2006)
Terry Bisson: "Brother, Can You Spare a Dime?" (Originally in Golden Age SF: Tales of a Bygone Future, 2006)
Cory Doctorow: "When Sysadmins Ruled the Earth" (Originally in Flurb, 2006)
 Heather Lindsley: "Just Do It!" (Originally in F&SF, 2006)
Gardner R. Dozois: "Counterfactual" (Originally in F&SF, 2006)
 Edd Vick: "Moon Does Run" (Originally in Electric Velocipede, 2006)
Mary Rosenblum: "Home Movies" (Originally in Asimov's, 2006)
Rudy Rucker: "Chu and the Nants" (Originally in Asimov's, 2006)
 Ian Creasey: "Silence in Florence" (Originally in Asimov's, 2006)
 Kameron Hurley: "The Women of Our Occupation" (Originally in Strange Horizons, 2006)
Claude Lalumière: "This Is the Ice Age" (Originally in Mythspring, 2006)
Eileen Gunn: "Speak, Geek" (Originally in Nature, 2006)
Joe Haldeman: "Expedition, with Recipes" (Originally in Elemental, 2006)
Liz Williams: "The Age of Ice" (Originally in Asimov's, 2006)
Michael Flynn: "Dawn, and Sunset, and the Colours of the Earth" (Originally in Asimov's, 2006)
Gregory Benford: "Applied Mathematical Theology" (Originally in Nature, 2006)
Carol Emshwiller: "Quill" (Originally in Firebirds Rising, 2006)
Alastair Reynolds: "Tiger, Burning" (Originally in Forbidden Planets, 2006)
Paul J. McAuley: "Dead Men Walking" (Originally in Asimov's, 2006)
 Daryl Gregory: "Damascus" (Originally in F&SF, 2006)
Michael Swanwick: "Tin Marsh" (Originally in Asimov's, 2006)
Ian R. MacLeod: "Taking Good Care of Myself" (Originally in Nature, 2006)
Stephen Baxter: "The Lowland Expedition" (Originally in Analog, 2006)
Wil McCarthy: "Heisenberg Elementary" (Originally in Asimov's, 2006)
Robert Reed: "Rwanda" (Originally in Asimov's, 2006)
 Charlie Rosenkrantz: "Preemption" (Originally in Analog, 2006)

External links

2007 anthologies
Year's Best SF anthology series
Eos Books books
2000s science fiction works